Jamalpur is a village in the Bawani Khera tehsil and Bawani Khera (Vidhan Sabha constituency) of Bhiwani district in Haryana state of India.

Demographic
, the village had 1723 households with a population of 8,846 of which 4,668 were male and 4,178 female.

Economy
Economy is mainly agrarian, supported by small number of government job and minor local commercial activities such as Ishan Automobiles, an authorized service centre of Bajaj Two-wheeler.

See also

 Bidhwan
 Badya Jattan
 Badyan Brahmnan
 Kanwari
 Nalwa
 Tosham

External links
 Google location map

References

Villages in Bhiwani district